Raphael Simon Spiegel (born 19 December 1992) is a Swiss professional footballer who plays as a goalkeeper for Lausanne-Sport.

Club career

Early career in Switzerland
Spiegel began his early career with hometown club FC Rüttenen before being snapped up by Swiss Super League-side Grasshopper Club of Zürich in August 2007. At Grasshopper he rose through the youth ranks at the club, soon playing regularly for the reserves. He was unable to establish himself in their first team and was sent out on a short loan to FC Wil early in the 2011–2012 season though he did not make an appearance for the team. Spiegel returned to Grasshopper only to be sent on loan again, this time to SC Brühl for the rest of the season. He made his debut for Brühl on 6 November 2011 against FC Locarno in a 2–1 away loss. After a successful run in the first team during his loan at Brühl, Spiegel returned to Grasshopper.

West Ham United and loans
On 23 July 2012, Spiegel signed for West Ham United after their return to the English Premier League, for an undisclosed fee. After joining West Ham United, Spiegel featured in games for the Under-21 squad and was a reserve goalkeeper, working as an understudy to Jussi Jääskeläinen and Adrián.

On 18 July 2014 he signed for Crawley Town on a one-month loan deal until 16 August 2014 before returning to West Ham without having played for Crawley. On 25 November 2014 he signed on a one-month loan for Barnet making his debut the same day in a 2–1 away defeat to Bristol Rovers. This was his only appearance before his loan spell was cut short due to injury.

On 20 February 2015 Spiegel signed for Carlisle United on an initial one-month loan deal. He made his debut the following day in a 3–2 home defeat by Wycombe Wanderers. He returned to West Ham on 23 March 2015 having made two appearances for Carlisle.

Spiegel was part of the West Ham U23 team that won promotion to the Premier League 2 Division 1 via the 2016-17 Play Offs, defeating Newcastle Utd U23's in the final.

Boavista
It was announced in June 2017 that Spiegel's contract with West Ham would be terminated by mutual consent. A few days later he signed with Portuguese Primeira Liga team Boavista.

Lausanne-Sport
On 9 June 2022, Spiegel signed with Lausanne-Sport.

International career
Spiegel is currently a Switzerland youth international. In 2009, he was part of the Swiss under-17 team that won the 2009 FIFA U-17 World Cup beating the host nation Nigeria 1–0 in the final. He remained an unused substitute throughout the tournament though, unable to displace Swiss first choice Benjamin Siegrist who would go on to win the Golden Glove.

Honours
FIFA U-17 World Cup: 2009

References

External links

 

1992 births
Sportspeople from the canton of Solothurn
Living people
Swiss men's footballers
Association football goalkeepers
Switzerland youth international footballers
Switzerland under-21 international footballers
Grasshopper Club Zürich players
FC Wil players
SC Brühl players
West Ham United F.C. players
Crawley Town F.C. players
Barnet F.C. players
Carlisle United F.C. players
Boavista F.C. players
FC Winterthur players
FC Lausanne-Sport players
Swiss 1. Liga (football) players
Swiss Challenge League players
National League (English football) players
English Football League players
Swiss expatriate footballers
Expatriate footballers in England
Swiss expatriate sportspeople in England
Expatriate footballers in Portugal
Swiss expatriate sportspeople in Portugal